The Jacobs River or Makawhio River is located some  south of Fox Glacier in South Westland, New Zealand. From its headwaters near Fettes Peak below the Hooker Range it flows in a westerly direction to enter the Tasman Sea near Hunts Beach. Its tributaries include Jumbo Creek and Pavo Creek. Just upstream from the bridge is Borat Flat.

The river is of cultural significance to Ngāi Tahu, a South Island iwi (tribe), which holds manawhenua or tribal authority over the land in accordance with the Ngāi Tahu Claims Settlement Act 1998. There are a number of sacred sites and burial places along the river. The river has also been a source of seafood for Ngāi Tahu, and is a source of Aotea, a rock containing kyanite that is only found in the river. In 2016 GNS Science was awarded funding to investigate the commercial potential of Aotea.

References

Westland District
Rivers of the West Coast, New Zealand
Rivers of New Zealand